John Simmonds may refer to:

John Simmonds (musician) in Another Joe
John Simmonds (producer) of Beyond Our Ken
John Simmonds (motorcyclist) in 1963 Grand Prix motorcycle racing season
John Simmonds (political candidate), see Electoral results for the district of Melbourne
John Simmonds, character played by Clancy Brown

See also
John Simonds (disambiguation)
John Symonds (disambiguation)
John Simmons (disambiguation)